Survivor: VIP (Hisardut VIP) is the sixth season of the Israeli reality program Survivor. The show features 16 celebrity contestants, competing against each other for the 1 million NIS prize and the title of "Sole Survivor". At the live reunion on August 29, 2012, Itai Segev was named the winner over Anat Harel, and Yulia Plotkin was named the audience's favorite player by winning a public vote.

Several new twists were introduced this season. This season introduced the Negotiation Cabin, where two contestants, one from each tribe, met to negotiate deals, such as allocating resources or picking castaways to switch tribes. This season also introduced Hope Island, in which voted out contestants were exiled to a secluded beach where they would compete against other voted out contestants for a chance to return to the game, similar to the Island of the Dead from the first and fourth season. Unlike the Island of the Dead, the voted out contestants had to choose a representative from their old tribe to compete in their stead, with the winning representative earning a clue to the hidden immunity idol; after the merge, the voted out contestants competed for themselves. Additionally, the contestant who placed last in the veto challenge received a penalty vote at the next Tribal Council.

Contestants

Future appearances
Michael Lewis returned for the 2021 season of Survivor: VIP.

Season summary

Episode Summaries

Episode 01-02 (Days 1-3)
Upon arriving to the island, the 16 celebrities had to scramble to find 14 immunity idols buried in mud. After a long struggle, several stars who had already claimed their immunity went back to help others. Azzam went back to help and when he pulled up an idol, no one claimed it until Anat ran and snatched it away. This upset everyone, who wanted the idol to be given out in a fair way. Each box contained a small totem and Harel ended up with two, meaning he could save either Nataly or Iris (who had nothing). He chose to save Nataly, eliminating Iris from the game. The 15 remaining celebrities then moved onto the beach and were nervous because the host had not shown up. Finally, at their first Immunity Challenge, Oshri and Itay T. (who are best friends in real life) were split up and made team captains. Oshri picked the Dạng (Thai for "famous") and Itay's tribe was Tinyum ("popular"). The first challenge commenced until model Michael fell to the ground screaming that his chest was hurting. Medical immediately rushed in and the challenge was stopped while Michael was carried away. Another celebrity revealed that Michael had a heart condition that prevented him from serving in the military. Upon his removal, both tribes were sent home. Later, Inbal and Buki entered the negotiation hut to fight for rice and flint. Inbal left with the better deal, putting Buki in trouble with his tribe. Tinyum won the first Immunity, sending Dạng to Tribal Council. While Buki's loud and aggressive personality rubbed people the wrong way, Doron was viewed as a bully and childish. His final tirade at Tribal Council, insulting the younger generation and calling Buki "disgusting," sealed his fate and Dạng voted out Doron, arguably their strongest player.

Episode 03-04 (Days 4-6)
Inbal went into the negotiation hut for the second time and, again, left with a great deal for her team. Despite this, Tinyum members continued to voice their distaste for Inbal's constant talking and apparent attempts to control camp life. A twist was revealed, called Hope Island, and the two eliminated players Iris and Doron returned to select a player from each tribe to compete on behalf of them for a chance to stay on Hope Island and eventually reenter the game. Iris chose Azam, while Doron picked Oshri. At the duel, Oshri was about to win but lost on purpose in order to send Doron home permanently, which is what his tribe wanted. At Dạng, Buki's sexual remarks began to bother model Nataly. At Tinyum, Harel accused Itay T. of creating alliances, which led to a very heated confrontation during which personal remarks were made. Itay T. later sat out of the Immunity Challenge, in hopes that his tribe would lose and they could send Harel home. His plan worked and they lost. Ana and Anat wanted to get rid of Inbal, while Itay T. wished to eliminate Harel. At the Individual Immunity challenge, Inbal won, shifting the focus to Harel. Inbal tried to get Azam and Moshe to join her and Harel in voting out Itay T., who she saw as the leader of the "Tel Aviv" alliance with Ana and Anat. At Tribal Council, Harel said that he was too emotional for the game and wasn't prepared for the social intrigues. Inbal was attacked by her entire tribe for being too controlling and not listening to others. Inbal admitted that she talks too much but still felt hurt. Apparently wanting to go, Inbal got up and took off her Immunity Necklace, giving it to Harel instead. He said he didn't want it and the tribe convinced Inbal to take it back and not to quit. After a long conversation, she took it back and the Tinyum tribe voted out Harel.

Episode 05-06 (Days 7-9)
Inbal cried on the beach after being attacked at Tribal Council the night before but admitted that her teammates were right about her aggressive personality. At the Negotiation Hut, Anat from Tinyum and Nataly from Dạng met and received raincoats with their tribe colors on them. However, each woman had an extra coat with the opposing team's color, meaning that they would have to give up one tribemate each. Anat gave up Moshe while Nataly gave up Michal. Nataly returned to Dạng very emotional and revealed the news that Michal would be sent away. Moshe was relieved to be joining the other team, since he felt disrespected by Tinyum. Upon arriving at Tinyum, Michal was informed by Itay T. of the three-person alliance between him, Ana and Anat. When Michal asked to join their group, he blatantly refused and told her to "wait a day." Tinyum won the Reward Challenge and got a BBQ. At Dạng, Nataly accused Yulia of warming up to her only because Michal (her friend) was gone. This led to a huge fight between them in front of the entire team, during which both girls accused the other of being two-faced. Buki took Yulia's side, calling Nataly a bully. Meanwhile, Moshe expressed his anger at Itai S.'s belittling of him, albeit in a playful way, and worried what his family would think. At the Immunity Challenge, Inbal dropped out early claiming her hands were too numb to carry a rope, infuriating Tinyum. Iris and Harel (the evictees on Hope Island) chose Inbal and Azzam to compete for them, with Azzam winning and Iris being eliminated for good. During Tinyum's Individual Immunity challenge, Inbal again opted out of the game, refusing to even try. Inbal's poor attitude caused further shouting matches back at camp. Inbal realized that Michal's presence at Tinyum could help her and Azzam force a tie at Tribal Council, due to Itay T.'s arrogance with Michal upon her arrival. At Tribal Council, the attacks on Inbal continued and she said that Itay, Ana and Anat were tyrants. The alliance continued to express their distaste for Inbal and resented being attacked for what they claimed was "friendship" and not an alliance. The votes were read and to everyone's surprise, it was 3-3 between Inbal and Ana. The two were forced to partake in a fire-building tiebreaker and Ana won, sealing Inbal's fate. Before leaving, Inbal defended Azzam's honor while fighting with Ana and Itay T. Inbal became the fourth person voted out of the game.

Episode 07-08 (Days 10-12)
Azzam attacked Turgi (Itay T.) after Tribal Council, accusing him of being a liar. Turgi was angry that Azzam shook his hand and flipped his vote at Tribal Council. At Team Dạng, Yulia wept after being told off by Nataly after Michal was swapped over to Tinyum. When it came time for the tribes to pick a Negotiator, a huge altercation took place between Azzam and Turgi, during which Azzam made a threat of physical violence. At the Negotiation Hut, Itai S. and Michal had to pick a teammate to send to the opposing camp to be their servant. Itai S. picked Moshe, which upset Moshe, who was afraid his children would be ashamed to see their father being a servant on television. Michal chose to send Azzam because he wanted nothing to do with his team. However, when he discovered the twist, he once again flew into a rage and refused to be the team's servant. (There are racial/political implications involved, since Azzam is a Druze and the others are not). On Hope Island, Inbal was eliminated. At the Immunity Challenge, Guy reveals that Moshe and Azzam will remain part of their teams until after the next vote and will be immune. Michal regrets sending Azzam to the opposing team because now she is the only target at Tinyum. Ana and Turgi have a romantic alliance forming, which makes their alliance mate Anat nervous. She started the alliance with Ana and now Turgi has taken over as the leader. Turgi wins Personal Immunity and at Tribal Council, Michal begs Anat to save her because they are both mothers with children back home. Moshe admits that the "Tel Aviv" alliance is hard to be around, but in the end, Michal is the only vote that will ruffle the least feathers and she is eliminated.

Voting history

Notes

External links
Nana 10

Survivor (Israeli TV series)
Channel 10 (Israeli TV channel) original programming
2012 Israeli television seasons
Television shows filmed in Thailand